Wang Lei (born February 4, 1975) is a Chinese chess player holding the title of Woman Grandmaster. She was in the FIDE Top 50 Women rating list from 2000 to 2003. Wang is a four-time Chinese women's champion (1997, 1998, 2000, 2001). In 1996 she won the Women's World University Chess Championship in León, Spain.

Wang competed for the China national chess team four times at the Women's Chess Olympiads (1990, 1996, 1998, 2000) with an overall record of 32 games played (+21, =8, -3), and once at the Women's Asian Team Chess Championship (1999) with an overall record of 4 games played (+3, =0, -1). She was also on the Chinese women's team in the first China - Russia Chess Summit.

References

External links
Wang Lei - New in Chess NICBase Online Info
Wang Lei chess games at 365Chess.com

Wang Lei at Chessmetrics
Wang Lei FIDE rating history at benoni.de

1975 births
Living people
Chess woman grandmasters
Chess Olympiad competitors
Chinese female chess players
Chess players from Shanghai